James Seanor (born 1833, date of death unknown) was a Master-at-Arms in the Union Navy who served during the American Civil War and a recipient of the U.S. military's highest decoration, the Medal of Honor, for his actions at the Battle of Mobile Bay.

Born in 1833 in Boston, Massachusetts, Seanor was living in New York when he joined the Navy. For this action, both Seanor and Jones were awarded the Medal of Honor four months later, on December 31, 1864.

Seanor's official Medal of Honor citation reads:
Served as Master-at-Arms on board the U.S. Ironclad Chickasaw, Mobile Bay, 5 August 1864. Although his enlistment was up, Seanor volunteered for the battle of Mobile Bay, going on board the Chickasaw from the Vincennes where he carried out his duties gallantly throughout the engagement which resulted in the capture of the rebel ram Tennessee.

References 

1833 births
Year of death missing
People from Boston
People of Massachusetts in the American Civil War
Union Navy sailors
United States Navy Medal of Honor recipients
American Civil War recipients of the Medal of Honor